Draft 7.30 is the seventh album by English electronic music duo Autechre, released on 7 April 2003 by Warp Records.

Around the time of the album's release, Sean Booth stated in an interview that "[rhythm] doesn't seem to limit us in the way it did when we first started".

Reception

The album received mixed to positive reviews from critics. Dominique Leone of Pitchfork Media said the album "doesn't break much new ground", but also thought that "Booth and Brown return to more straightforward grounds, even if they don't quite reach their mid-90s peak as melodic technicians". Pascal Wyse of The Guardian said, "Buried in this splintered, maths-driven world, down there with the metal insects, are shards of musical convention that keep a humanity alive", adding that the music "becomes quite a beautiful picture of the chaos of your brain".

Track listing

References

External links
 Draft 7.30 at the official Warp discography (features audio clips).

2003 albums
Autechre albums
Warp (record label) albums